David Phelps may refer to:

 David Phelps (musician) (born 1969), American Christian music vocalist and songwriter
 David Phelps (sport shooter) (born 1977), British sport shooter
 David Phelps (baseball) (born 1986), American baseball pitcher
 David D. Phelps (born 1947), U.S. Representative from Illinois
 David Sutton Phelps Jr. (1930–2009), American anthropologist